Aulotandra angustifolia is a monocotyledonous plant species native to Northeast Madagascar. It was first described in 1939 by Joseph Marie Henry Alfred Perrier de la Bâthie. Aulotandra angustifolia is part of the genus Aulotandra and the family Zingiberaceae.

References 

Alpinioideae
Endemic flora of Madagascar
Taxa named by Joseph Marie Henry Alfred Perrier de la Bâthie